Ephedra viridis, known by the common names green Mormon tea, green ephedra, and Indian tea, is a species of Ephedra. It is indigenous to the Western United States, where it is a member of varied scrub, woodland, desert, and open habitats. It grows at  elevations.

Description
The Ephedra viridis shrub is woody below, topped with many dense clusters of erect bright green twigs. They may yellow somewhat with age.

Nodes along the twigs are marked by the tiny pairs of vestigial leaves, which start out reddish but soon dry to brown or black. Since the leaves are no longer functional, the stems are green and photosynthetic.

Male plants produce pollen cones at the nodes, each under a centimeter long with protruding yellowish sporangiophores. Female plants produce seed cones which are slightly larger and contain two seeds each.

Uses
The drug ephedrine, an antidepressant and decongestant, is made from this and other Ephedra species. A tea can be made by boiling the stems, whence the common name, "green Mormon tea".

The plant was used medicinally by both Native Americans and the ancient Chinese (using their own local species of the genus) to treat various afflictions including sexually transmitted diseases such as gonorrhea and syphilis, kidney diseases, and complications with menstruation. Native American tribes such as the Shoshone and Paiute boiled tea using the stem of the plant and combined it with the bark of Purshia tridentata, another shrub.

In modern medicine, the plant is to treat sinus illnesses such as hay fever, common colds, and sinusitis. This use is supported by clinical trials, as is its treatment of bronchial asthma.

Because the plant can be used as an appetite suppressant, it is used illegally by some athletes to lose weight and build muscle.

Because it is toxic, the plant should not be ingested without a doctor’s recommendation.

References

External links

Jepson Manual Treatment: Ephedra viridis
Ecology
Ephedra viridis — U.C. Photo gallery

viridis
North American desert flora
Flora of the Western United States
Plants described in 1893
Flora without expected TNC conservation status